Brigadier James Gordon Kerr,  (born c. 1948), is a senior British Army officer serving as former defence attaché to the British embassy in Beijing, China and former head of the controversial Force Research Unit in Northern Ireland.

Kerr was born in Aberdeen. His military career began when he was commissioned into the Gordon Highlanders on a Special Regular Commission shortly after leaving university in 1970. He served in Cyprus before his first posting to Northern Ireland in 1972, where he worked as an undercover intelligence officer. Between 1972 and 1987 he worked in a variety of posts related to army intelligence in Northern Ireland, Berlin, and at army training centres in Great Britain.  He transferred to a Regular Commission in 1974 and transferred to the Intelligence Corps in 1977. He was promoted Lieutenant in 1971, Captain in 1974, Major in 1980, Lieutenant-Colonel in 1987, Colonel in 1993, and Brigadier in 1998.

In 1987, then Lieutenant-Colonel Kerr became head of the Force Research Unit, a military intelligence organisation that ran agents in both Irish republican and Ulster loyalist paramilitary groups. Much controversy stemmed from the amount of military intelligence the FRU gave to the loyalist groups.

In October 1997, Kerr was appointed as defence attaché to Beijing. While he was there, his name was published by the Sunday Herald as a consequence of the investigation into the FRU by the Stevens Inquiry.
A former PSNI Chief Constable, Sir Hugh Orde, said Gordon Kerr, former head of the Army's secret Force Research Unit (FRU), should have been put on trial.

See also
Martin Ingram
Pat Finucane

References

External links
Article on Gordon Kerr's involvement in Northern Ireland

British military personnel of The Troubles (Northern Ireland)
Gordon Highlanders officers
Intelligence Corps officers
Living people
Officers of the Order of the British Empire
Military personnel from Aberdeen
Recipients of the Queen's Gallantry Medal
British Army brigadiers
British military attachés
1948 births
British expatriates in China